Kalawana Divisional Secretariat is a  Divisional Secretariat  of Ratnapura District, of Sabaragamuwa Province, Sri Lanka.

References
 Divisional Secretariats Portal

Divisional Secretariats of Ratnapura District